In the late 1930s the US Army began setting requirements for custom built tactical trucks, winning designs would be built in quantity. As demand increased during WWII some standardized designs were built by other manufactures.

Most trucks had gasoline (G) engines until the early 1960s, when multifuel (M) and diesel (D) engines were introduced. Since then diesel fuel has increasingly been used, the last gasoline engine vehicles were built in 1985.

Most engines have been water-cooled with inline (I) cylinders, but V types (V) and opposed (O) engines have also been used. Three air-cooled engines were used in two very light trucks. Gasoline engines up to WWII were often valve in block design (L-head), during the war more overhead valve (ohv) engines were used, and after the war all new engines (except 1 F-head and 1 Overhead camshaft (ohc)) have been ohv. All diesel engines have ohv, they can be naturally aspired, supercharged  (SC), or turbocharged (TC). 

The same engines have been used in different trucks, and larger trucks often have had different engines during their service life. Because of application and evolution, the same engine often has different power ratings. Ratings are in SAE gross horsepower.

The front of an engine is the fan end, the rear is the flywheel end, right and left are as viewed from the rear, regardless of how the engine is mounted in the vehicle. Engines in the tables are water-cooled and naturally aspirated unless noted.

AM General/Kaiser Jeep/Willys

Caterpillar

Chevrolet – GMC

Continental

Cummins

Detroit Diesel

Dodge-Fargo

Ford

Hall-Scott

Hercules

International Harvester

LeRoi

Mack

REO

Notes

References

Works cited 

 
 
 

Military trucks of the United States
United States Army tactical truck engines
Tactical truck engines
United States Army tactical truck engines